Michael David Black (born August 24, 1964 in Auburn, California) is a former American football offensive tackle in the National Football League for the Philadelphia Eagles and the New York Giants.  He played college football at California State University, Sacramento and was drafted in the ninth round of the 1986 NFL Draft.

External links
Just Sports Stats

1964 births
Living people
People from Auburn, California
American football offensive tackles
Sacramento State Hornets football players
Sportspeople from Greater Sacramento
Philadelphia Eagles players
New York Giants players
Players of American football from California